Diane Samuels (born 1960) is a British author and playwright.

Samuels was born into a Jewish family in Liverpool in 1960. She was educated at King David High School, Liverpool, studied history at Sidney Sussex College, Cambridge and then studied for a PGCE in drama at Goldsmiths, University of London.  She worked as a drama teacher in inner London secondary schools for five years and as an education officer at the Unicorn Theatre for children.

Samuels lives in London and has been a full-time writer since 1992.  She was a Pearson Creative Research Fellow at the British Library and is a visiting lecturer at Regent's University London and a reviewer of books for The Guardian newspaper.

Works
Her works include:  
 Frankie's Monster (1991), an adaptation of Vivien Alcock's children's book The Monster Garden
 Kindertransport (1993) examines the life, during World War II and afterwards, of a Kindertransport child. Though fictitious, it is based upon many real kindertransport stories. 
 The True Life Fiction of Mata Hari (2001)  was first performed at the Palace Theatre, Watford, in 2002, with Greta Scacchi in the lead role.
 3 Sisters on Hope Street (2008), co-written with Tracy-Ann Oberman, is a reinterpretation of Chekhov's The Three Sisters, transferring events to Liverpool after World War II and re-casting the Pozorov sisters as three Jewish Englishwomen. It was first staged at the Everyman Theatre, Liverpool in 2008.
 The A-Z of Mrs P (2011), a musical co-written with composer Gwyneth Herbert, tells the story of Phyllis Pearsall's creation of the London A to Z street atlas. It opened in London at Southwark Playhouse on 21 February 2014, starring Peep Show actress Isy Suttie and Frances Ruffelle.
 Poppy + George (2016), another collaboration with Gwyneth Herbert,  was performed at the Palace Theatre, Watford  in February 2016.
This is Me (2018), an autobiographical monologue, was performed at Chickenshed in Southgate, London in 2018.
 The Rhythm Method (2018), a  musical about contraception,  was performed at the Landor Space in Clapham, London in May 2018. It was yet another collaboration with Gwyneth Herbert.

References

External links
 

1960 births
Living people
 
20th-century English dramatists and playwrights
20th-century English women writers
21st-century British dramatists and playwrights
21st-century English women writers
Alumni of Goldsmiths, University of London
Alumni of Sidney Sussex College, Cambridge
Dramatists and playwrights from Liverpool
English Jewish writers
English women dramatists and playwrights
Jewish dramatists and playwrights
Jewish women writers
People educated at King David High School, Liverpool